Mauritius made its Paralympic Games debut at the 1996 Summer Paralympics in Atlanta. It was represented by two male competitors in track and field, Sarwan Custnea and Enrico Cytheree. Absent in 2000, Mauritius returned to the Paralympics in 2004 with two runners, one male (Richard Souci) and one female (Salatchee Murday). The country again had two representatives in 2008: Souci, and male swimmer, Pascal Laperotine.

Muritius has never taken part in the Winter Paralympics, and its athletes have never won a Paralympic medal.

See also
 Mauritius at the Olympics

References